Karina Krawczyk (born 5 August 1971) is a German actress and occasionally works as a fashion model.

Acting career
Karina Krawczyk speaks Polish, German, English, and French fluently. She studied acting at the theater school Jacques Lecoq in Paris, France and with Ariane Mnouchkine at the „Théâtre du soleil“ [Translated: Theater of the Sun]. Between 1994 and 1997 she was a member of the „Theater Kreatur“ in Berlin, Germany.

Besides her work as actress, Krawczyk occasionally works as a fashion model. In 2001, she appeared in a series of television commercials for the German automobile manufacturer Audi. Krawczyk also played roles in the music videos Mach die Augen zu [Translated: Close Your Eyes] by the German band Die Ärzte and Kein Alkohol (ist auch keine Lösung)! [Translated: No Alcohol (Is Not A Solution Either)!] by the German band Die Toten Hosen.

Since 1997 she played several roles in movie and television productions. In Katharina Thalbach's production of Oscar Wilde's comedy The Importance of Being Earnest at the Theater am Kurfürstendamm in Berlin, Germany Krawczyk played the role of Cecily Cardew in winter 2006. Since 2009 she plays a role in Katharina Thalbach's production of William Shakespeare's play As You Like It at the Theater am Kurfürstendamm.

Personal life
Karina Krawczyk was in a relationship with Andreas Frege (Campino), lead singer of the German band Die Toten Hosen. The couple separated in 2006. Krawczyk and Frege have a son who was born in March 2004.

Filmography
 1997: Francis
 1997: Hundsgemein
 1998: Babyraub – Kinder fremder Mächte
 1998: 
 1998: The Polar Bear
 1999: Bang Boom Bang
 2000: Die Unbesiegbaren
 2000: Der Sommer mit Boiler
 2001: Heinrich der Säger
 2001: Polizeiruf 110: Die Frau des Fleischers
 2002: Der Morgen nach dem Tod
 2003: Das Herz ist rot
 2004: Einmal Bulle, immer Bulle – Die Stimme des Mörders
 2007: Nachmittag (Afternoon)
 2007: Paulas Geheimnis
 2007: Verrückt nach Clara
 2009: Flemming: Das Blut der Liebe
 2011: Remembrance
 2012: Mord mit Aussicht

References

External links
 

1971 births
Living people
German film actresses
German television actresses
Actresses from Gdańsk
German female models
20th-century German actresses
21st-century German actresses
German people of Polish descent